Joie de vivre is the third studio album by French singer Louane. It was released on October 23, 2020, by Mercury Records.

Singles
Four songs from the album were released as singles. "Donne-moi ton cœur" was released as a single on 3 July 2020. "Poésie Indécise" was released as a single on 28 September 2020. "Désolée" was released as a single on 17 November 2020. "Aimer à mort" was released as the fourth single.

Sales performance
The album sold over 12,000 copies in France after its first week, making it to the top 6. At the same time, it managed to be the 4th most sold in pure copies. The album exceeded 50,000 copies in France in January 2021 and 100,000 copies in December of the same year.

Track listing

Charts

Weekly charts

Year-end charts

Release history

References

French-language albums
2020 albums
Louane (singer) albums